Sæbøvik is a village in Kvinnherad municipality in Vestland county, Norway. The village is located at the southern end of the Halsnøy Tunnel.

This makes it the largest urban area on the island, just after the neighboring village of Eidsvik

References

Villages in Vestland
Kvinnherad